Grojec  is a village in the administrative district of Gmina Boronów, within Lubliniec County, Silesian Voivodeship, in southern Poland.

The village has a population of 125.

References

Villages in Lubliniec County